Harvey Sachs, (born Cleveland, Ohio, June 8, 1946) is an American-Canadian-Swiss writer who has written books on musical subjects.

Writing
His books include biographies of and a book of essays on the Italian conductor Arturo Toscanini, plus an edited collection of Toscanini's letters.
 Toscanini, Philadelphia & New York: J. B. Lippincott, 1978.
 Reflections on Toscanini, New York: Grove Weidenfeld, 1991.
 The Letters of Arturo Toscanini, ed., New York: Knopf, 2002.
 Toscanini: Musician of Conscience, New York: Liveright Publishing Corporation, 2017.
One of his most recent books, Ten Masterpieces of Music, deals with works in ten different genres by ten different composers: Mozart, Beethoven, Schubert, Schumann, Berlioz, Verdi, Brahms, Sibelius, Prokofiev, and Stravinsky; it provides descriptive analyses of the ten compositions plus commentary on and historical background to the life of each composer (Ten Masterpieces of Music, New York: Liveright, 2021). Sachs has also written books on musical virtuosi, a history of music in Italy during the fascist period, a biography of Arthur Rubinstein, and a book on Beethoven's Ninth Symphony that is part cultural history, part musical description, and part personal memoir:
 Virtuoso, London, New York: Thames & Hudson, 1982.
 Music in Fascist Italy, New York: W. W. Norton, 1988.
 Rubinstein: A Life, New York: Grove Press, 1995.
 The Ninth: Beethoven and the World in 1824, New York: Random House, 2010.
 Ten Masterpieces of Music, New York: Liveright, 2021
He has written Schoenberg: Why He Matters, an interpretive biography, which will be published by Liveright, New York, in 2023.

Sachs also co-authored the memoirs of Plácido Domingo and Sir Georg Solti:
 Domingo, Plácido, My First Forty Years, New York: Knopf, 1983.
 Solti, Georg, Memoirs, New York: Knopf, 1997.

Sachs has written pieces for periodicals that include The New Yorker, The New York Times, the Wall Street Journal, the Times [London] Literary Supplement, Il Sole 24 Ore, and La Stampa; and record companies that include Deutsche Grammophon and RCA/Sony Classics.

Work and family
Sachs is on the faculty of the Curtis Institute of Music in Philadelphia. From 2011 to 2013 he was the Leonard Bernstein Scholar-in-Residence of the New York Philharmonic. As a young man he worked as a conductor, mainly in Canada, where he lived in his twenties. He then lived in Europe for more than 30 years, mostly in Italy but also in England and Switzerland. From 2004 to 2006 he was Artistic Director of the Societa' del Quartetto di Milano, Italy's oldest extant concert society. He has been married twice and has two children - Julian Sachs (b. 1984), an administrator at New York University's Casa Italiana Zerilli-Marimo'; and Lyuba Sachs (b. 1998), a student at the Nuova Accademia di Belle Arti in Milan. His partner, pianist Eve Wolf, is the founder and executive artistic director of the New York-based Ensemble for the Romantic Century. Sachs has lived in New York City since 2006.

References

1946 births
Living people
Writers from Cleveland